False Tasmanian blenny is a common name for several fishes native to Australia and may refer to:

Parablennius intermedius
Parablennius postoculomaculatus, native to Western Australia

Fish common names